Dalibor Milenković  (Serbian Cyrillic: Далибор Миленковић; born January 9, 1987) is a former Serbian goalkeeper.

External links
 Profile at Srbijafudbal.
 

1987 births
Sportspeople from Kruševac
Living people
Serbian footballers
Association football goalkeepers
FK Napredak Kruševac players
FK Radnički Niš players
FK Kolubara players
Serbian SuperLiga players
Serbian First League players